Jasmine Nightdreams is the fifth studio album by Edgar Winter, released in 1975.

Track listing

Personnel

Musicians
Edgar Winter - "the nightdreamer" - vocals, saxophone, keyboards, synthesizer
Johnny Winter - "slide rider" - slide guitar, harmonica
Rick Derringer - "live wire+" - guitar
Dan Hartman - "co-creator" - bass guitar, vocals
Chuck Ruff - "rougé" - drums
Rick Marotta - "the different drummer" - drums

Technical
Design – John Berg, Teresa Alfieri
Directed by – Rick Dobbis
Directed by  – Steve Paul
Engineer – Dan Hartman
Engineer (quadraphonic remix) – Shelly Yakus
Engineer (quadraphonic sound) – Dan Hartman, Edgar Winter
Mastered by (disc master) – Greg Calbi
Mixed by (assistant) – David Thoener, Jimmy Iovine, Rod O'Brien
Mixed by (mix master) – Shelly Yakus
Photography (cover) – Steinbicker/ Houghton
Photography (inside) – Bruce Weber, Wendi E. Lombardi
Remix (supervision) – Dan Hartman, Edgar Winter

1975 albums
Edgar Winter albums
Blue Sky Records albums